This is a timeline of the history of the city of Salem, Massachusetts, United States.

Timeline

17th century

 1626
 Settlers arrive.
 1629
 Town of Salem incorporated.

 1636
 First muster on Salem Common. This was the first time that a regiment of militia drilled for the common defense of a multi-community area,  thus laying the foundation for what became the Army National Guard.
 1644
 Fort Pickering established.

 1649
 Salem Custom House built. It collected taxes on imported cargoes.
 1651
 Pickering House built (approximate date).
 1655
 The Retire Becket House is built and later moved in 1924 to the campus of the House of the 7 Gables. Retire Beckett's ships were masterpieces and Cleopatra's Barge was the first oceangoing yacht built in the United States. It was built in 1816 at Salem, MA by shipbuilder Retire Becket for owner George Crowninshield Jr. 
 1664
 Pickman House built. It is now owned by the Peabody Essex Museum and is not open to the public.
 1665
 Gedney House built (approximate date). It is now operated as a non-profit museum by Historic New England. The house is rarely open to the public, though private tours can be arranged.

 1668
 First phase on the original construction by Captain John Turner the 1st.  Now the House of the Seven Gables It remained in his family for three generations, descending from John Turner II to John Turner III and then was sold to Captain Ingersol in 1782.  After this Nathaniel Hawthorne wrote The House of the Seven Gables, a Gothic novel written beginning in mid-1850 by American author Nathaniel Hawthorne.  Elizabeth Cate Upton (1840-1909) purchased the Turner-Ingersoll Mansion in 1883 and lived in the house with her family until 1908 when they sold the site to Caroline Emmerton.  When a relative died in 1912, her obituary read: "She was the richest woman in Salem, well known for her charitable disposition and ever ready to extend a helping hand to those who were desirous of helping themselves, and to those who were unable to help themselves."
 1675
 Jonathan Corwin house completed.
 Narbonne House built
 1680
 The Neal House is constructed at 12 Broad Street.
 1682
 The Hooper-Hathaway House at 23 Washington Street (a former bakery) was spared demolition  moved next to the House of the 7 Gables (sparing demolition)  in 1911 by a team effort of Caroline Emmerton and Historic New England.
John Ward House built. The house was moved to its present site in 1910 and restored by the Peabody Essex Museum. It is open for viewing on guided tour. Rooms on the first floor feature 17th-century furnishings.
 1688
William Murray House  built
 1692
 Salem witch trials begin.

18th century

 1727
 Crowninshield-Bentley House built (c. 1727 – 1730). A Colonial house in the Georgian style, located at 126 Essex Street, Salem, Massachusetts in the Essex Institute Historic District. It is now owned by the Peabody Essex Museum and open for public tours from June to October.
 1750
 Nathaniel Hawthorne Birthplace a wooden house built on Union Street and moved in 1958 to the House of the 7 Gables property and now a Historic District.  On the 4th of July 1804 to 1808 Hawthorne lived.  American author Nathaniel Hawthorne was born. It is located at 27 Hardy Street but accessible through 54 Turner Street, Salem, Massachusetts. The house is now a nonprofit museum along with the House of the Seven Gables 
 1757
  Samuel McIntire (January 16, 1757 – February 6, 1811) American architect and craftsman, born in Salem. He built a simple home and workshop on Summer Street in 1786.
 1760
 Salem Social Library organized.
 1762
 Derby House built
 Derby Wharf (1762, extended 1806) – Salem's longest wharf (nearly 1/2 mile). When in active use, it was lined with warehouses of goods from around the world. The Derby Wharf Light (1871) remains at the end of the wharf.
 1766
 Salem Marine Society instituted.
 1768
 Essex Gazette newspaper begins publication.
 1773
Nathaniel Bowditch (March 26, 1773 – March 16, 1838) American mathematician, born in Salem.

 1775
On February 26, 1775, patriots raised the drawbridge at the North River, preventing British Colonel Alexander Leslie and his 300 troops of the 64th Regiment of Foot from seizing stores and ammunition hidden in North Salem. A few months later, in May 1775, a group of prominent merchants with ties to Salem, including Francis Cabot, William Pynchon, Thomas Barnard, E. A. Holyoke and William Pickman, felt the need to publish a statement retracting what some interpreted as Loyalist leanings and to profess their dedication to the Colonial cause.
 1776
 Fort Lee built.
 1780
 May 19: New England's Dark Day, an unusual darkening of the day sky over the New England states and parts of Canada, so complete that candles were required from noon on. It is thought to have been caused by a combination of smoke from forest fires, a thick fog, and cloud cover, and did not disperse until the middle of the next night.
  Benjamin Hawkes House (a Federal mansion) built in the Derby Wharf Historic District on Derby Wharf.
 1781
 Salem Philosophical Library organized.
 1782
 Peirce-Nichols House built. It is now a National Historic Landmark.
 Cotting-Smith Assembly House built at 138 Federal Street as a Federalist Clubhouse in which balls, concerts, lectures, and other events might be held. It is now owned by the Peabody Essex Museum. George Washington attended a dance here. The original architect is unknown, but the house was later remodeled by Samuel McIntire for use as a private residence. The house is in the Federal style and is listed in the National Register of Historic Places.
The Captin Ingersol mansion, (now the house of the 7 Gables.) John Turner III lost everything and the house was sold to another mariner, Samuel Ingersoll, in 1782.
 Peirce-Nichols House, a Federal Mansion is built on Chestnut Street in what today is the Samuel McIntire Historic District.
 1784
Joshua Ward House built
 1785
 Original court house of Essex County Court Buildings built at 32 Federal Street. It was added to the National Register of Historic Places in 1976.
 1786
 Salem Mercury newspaper begins publication.
 1787
Rufus Choate House built. It is now in the  National Register of Historic Places

 1790
 Salem Gazette newspaper begins publication.
 Population: 7,921.
 1791
 Bakers Island Light established.
 1795
 Antique Colonial built in 1795, 15 Beckford Street in what is now the Historic McIntire District.
 1796
 Chestnut Street "laid out."
 1797
 Friendship of Salem built. She made 15 voyages during her career, to Batavia, India, China, South America, the Caribbean, England, Germany, the Mediterranean, and Russia; she was captured as a prize of war by the British in September 1812.
 Salem and Danvers Aqueduct incorporated.
 1799
 East India Marine Society established.

19th century

 1800
 Impartial Register newspaper begins publication.
 Ebenezer Shillaber Mansion is constructed at 128 Federal Street.
 1804
 Gardner-Pingree House built by Samuel McIntire in a Federal style
 1805
 First Universalist congregation founded.
 Hamilton Hall built in a Federal style in 1805 by Samuel McIntire and added to the National Register of Historic Places in 1970.
 Nathaniel Bowditch House built (circa 1805) at 9 North Street in the Federal Street District. It was once the home of Nathaniel Bowditch, the founder of modern navigation and author of  The New American Practical Navigator. It is now a National Historic Landmark and listed in the National Register of Historic Places. It currently serves as the home of Historic Salem, Inc.
 The Captain Jonathan Hodges constructed at brick Federal mansion at 12 Chestnut Street.
 1806
 Stephen Phillips House built. It is now in the National Register of Historic Places.
 Derby Wharf extended. Salem's longest wharf (nearly 1/2 mile). When in active use, it was lined with warehouses of goods from around the world. (Originally constructed 1762.)
 1808
 First Universalist Church built. It is now in the National Register of Historic Places.
 1809
 Thomas March Woodbridge House built
 1810
 Salem Athenaeum founded.
 Bible Society of Salem instituted.
 1811
 Joseph Story House built at 26 Winter Street for U.S. Supreme Court Justice Joseph Story. It is now a National Historic Landmark.
 Bessie Monroe House built.
 A large Federal Period house is built at 26 Winter Street.
 Salem Charitable Mechanic Association organized.
 Handel Society formed.
 1816
 Salem Old Town Hall built. It is the earliest surviving municipal structure in Salem (dating from 1816 to 1817) and an outstanding example of Federal architecture. The second floor of the building, Great Hall, has always been used as a public hall. The first floor, originally a public market, now houses the Salem Museum. 
 Cleopatra's Barge was the first oceangoing yacht built in the United States. It was built in 1816 at Salem.
 1818
 Salem Evangelical Library formed.
 1819
 Salem Society for the Moral and Religious Instruction of the Poor formed.
 Andrew–Safford House built, designed in the Federal style for a wealthy Russian fur merchant. It was reputed to have been the most costly house in the United States. It is now owned by the Peabody Essex Museum and listed in the National Register of Historic Places.
 Salem Customs House  built on the Salem Maritime National Historic Site, the 13th Customs House in Salem; the first was built in 1649. Each collected taxes on imported cargoes.
 1821
 Essex Historical Society incorporated.
 Haydn Society formed.
 1823
 Salem Observer newspaper begins publication.
 1825
 East India Marine Hall built.
 Mozart Association organized.
 1830
 Salem Lyceum formed.
 Bowker Place built.
 1831
 Salem Dispensary incorporated.
 Salem Mercury newspaper begins publication.
 1832
 Samaritan Society formed.
 Salem Advertiser and Argus newspaper begins publication.
 Salem Glee Club formed.
 1833
 Essex County Natural History Society organized.
 Seamen's Widow and Orphan Association formed.
 1834
 West Cogswell House, a historic set of row houses, built at 5-9 Summer Street in Salem, Massachusetts. It was added to the National Register of Historic Places in 1983.
 1836
 City of Salem incorporated.
 Leverett Saltonstall becomes mayor.
 1838
 City Hall built.
 Connecting Salem to Boston via Railroad happened in 1838 and is still in use today as the Salem (MBTA station). Service from Salem to East Boston began on August 27, 1838, with fares half that of competing stagecoaches.

 1839
 Salem Children's Friend Society organized.
 Salem Social Singing Society organized.
 The railroad in Salem received much more traffic than expected, and a branch line from Salem to Marblehead opened on December 10, 1839
 1840
 Harmony Grove Cemetery established.
 1841
 Female Washington Total Abstinence Society formed.
The Old Granite Courthouse built in the Greek Revival architectural style. Also known (circa 1862) as the County Commissioner's Building,
 1844
 A large Federal Period house is built at 24 Winter Street.
 1845
 A large Federal Period house is built at 16 Winter Street.
 1846
 Salem Academy of Music formed.
 1848
 Essex Institute established.

 1849
 Salem Philharmonic Society formed.
 1850
 Salem native Nathaniel Hawthorne publishes The Scarlet Letter.
 A small house is built at 14 Burnside Street.
 A large Federal Period houses are built at 2 & 3 Winter Street.
 1851
 Nathaniel Hawthorne's The House of the Seven Gables, a novel set in Salem, is published.
The Shepard Block built in the Greek Revival style at 298-304 Essex Street in the Chestnut Street District. It was added to the National Register of Historic Places in 1983.
 1852
 John Tucker Daland House built.

 1854
 Salem Normal School established.
 With direct Railroad connections to most of the major cities of northeastern Massachusetts by 1850, Salem became a major railroad junction.
 1855
 Salem Choral Society organized.
 Salem Musical Education Society formed.
 1857
 Plummer Hall built.
 1858
Salem Willows public park established
 1860
 A mixed use commercial & multi residential building is constructed at 116 Boston Street.
 1866
 An Incredible high style Victorian is constructed at 170 Federal Street.
 Caroline Emmerton was born in Salem and in 1908 would purchase the House of the 7 Gables, The Hooper-Hathaway House (1682) was moved to the property in 1911. The Retire Becket House (1655) was saved in 1924. 
John P. Peabody House built  at 15 Summer Street
 1868
 Peabody Academy of Science organized.
 Salem Oratorio Society formed.

 1871
 Derby Wharf Light built.

 1873
 A Stunning Victorian is built at 7 Winter Street.
 1876
 November: Boston-Salem telephone demonstration.
 1878
 Salem Schubert Club organized.
 By the 1870s, a roundhouse, coaling tower, and water tank were located inside the wye to serve the three lines from the west. The roundhouse was later rebuilt with more stalls and access from the south to serve commuter trains.
 1881
 North Street Fire Station built.

 1882
 On April 7, 1882, a fire resulting from an explosion of a can of fusees destroyed the wooden trainshed, although the granite facade and towers were intact. A wooden replacement was built around the burnt section. On December 2, 1884, the Eastern was acquired by the B&M. For several decades until the 1930s, Salem was the turnback point for a limited number of short turn trains.
 1883
Parker Brothers was founded by George S. Parker and Frederick Huntington "Fred" Parker in Salem. Parker Brothers is an American toy and game manufacturer and brand.
 1889
Wesley Methodist Church  built. It is now in the National Register of Historic Places.
 1897
 Society of St. Joseph founded.
 1898
 YMCA in Salem built at 284-296 Essex Street in the Downtown Salem District.

20th century 
 1901
 St. Nicholas Orthodox Church and Rectory is founded. It is now in the National Register of Historic Places.
 1903
 St. John the Baptist Parish founded.
 1906
 Parker Brothers publishes the game Rook. It quickly became the best-selling game in the country, and remains their most successful card game to this day.
 Salem Laundry building built. It is now on the National Register of Historic Places.
 1907
 The Salem Athenaeum's new building, at 337 Essex Street, dedicated. The Athenaeum was founded in 1810 and is one of the oldest private library organizations in the United States. In 1905, the Athenæum sold the building at 132 Essex Street to the Essex Institute (now the Peabody Essex Museum), and constructed its new building.
 1908
 Caroline Emmerton bought the Turner-Ingersoll house from the successful Upton family who sold the property after they moved to the Salem Willows neighborhood. today the Upton neighborhood of 1908 is the Salem Willows Historic District.  Emerton hired Joseph Everett Chandler as the architect.  Caroline O. Emmerton formed the House of Seven Gables Settlement Association & during a two-year restoration with  Joseph Everett Chandler built back the exterior to have seven gables like the book.  Clifford Pyncheon is Hepzibah's brother and Judge Pyncheon's cousin and for this designed a secret pasage from the 1st floor, with a false wall inside a closet off the first floor dining room.  The secret staircase goes up two full floors and is cut inside a center chimney to represent part of the book The House of the Seven Gables, Caroline O. Emmerton built a secret staircase inside the House of the Seven Gables as a secret pasageway for the character Clifford Pyncheon.  Hepzibah Pyncheon has a candy shop on the first floor facing Turner Street in representation with the book.  An office for Colonel Pyncheon is on the 2nd floor. The House of the Seven Gables opened to the public in April 1910 and has seen millions of visitors since.
 1909
 Registry of Deeds is built at 36 Federal Street. Salem Probate and Family Court wins Build New England.
 1914
 Great Salem Fire of 1914
 1915
 Peabody Museum of Salem formed.
 1925
 Palmer's Cove Yacht Club formed   in Salem Harbor. It sponsors the Bowditch Race each August in the Harbor.
 1930
 Pioneer Village living history museum opens.

 1932
 The Salem Post Office built at  2 Margin Street in downtown Salem.
 1933
 Salem Willows Yacht Club is incorporated.Home. It provides clubhouse facilities, dock, launch service, gas pump and dinghy storage.
 1935
 Coast Guard Air Station Salem established Feb.15 by  the U.S. Coast Guard on Winter Island  as a new seaplane facility because there is no space to expand the Gloucester Air Station at Ten Pound Island.
 The Misery Islands  in Salem Sound established as a nature reserve  managed by the Trustees of Reservations.
 Parker Brothers publishes the board game Monopoly. Monopoly, which evolved in the public domain before its commercialization, has seen many variants. The game is licensed in 103 countries and printed in 37 languages.
 1938
 Salem Maritime National Historic Site, now managed by the National Park Service was created (Match 17), a 9-acre park, the first National Historic Site in the United States.
 1944
 Air Station Salem officially designated as the first Air-Sea Rescue station on the eastern seaboard. The Martin PBM Mariner, a hold-over from the war, became the primary rescue aircraft. In the mid-1950s helicopters came as did Grumman HU-16 Albatross amphibious flying boats (UFs).
 1956
 The North Shore Shopping Center opens in neighboring Peabody, along with the Liberty Tree Mall in Danvers soon after, and slowly drains the economic strength of downtown Salem. By 1962, Salem would lose 40 percent of its stores and more than $1 million in taxes due to lower property assessments and abatements, triggering the formation of the still-operating Salem Redevelopment Authority.
 1958
 The B&M extended the Salem tunnel to the south, and soon after built a station in the southern approach span. However, the station lacked modern elements like parking capacity and elevators to make the below-ground-level platforms handicapped accessible. In 1987, the MBTA abandoned the station and built the present station at the north end of the tunnel. The 1959 station building remains at 89 Margin Street; it has been converted into a private school. The platforms remain extant in the tunnel approach, as do rusted pieces of staircases from Mill Street and a pedestrian overpass behind the station building.
 1962
 Facing the ongoing drain of massive shopping centers off of nearby Route 128, leaders form the Salem Redevelopment Authority.
 1964
 Hawthorne Cove Marina  established, a 110-slip marina on Salem Harbor near the Salem ferry terminal.
 1965
 The Nathaniel Bowditch House declared a National Historic Landmark.
 By this time, urban renewal — a growing trend of redeveloping economically blighted areas in cities — had destroyed 87 buildings and displaced 160 families when Ada Louise Huxtable ran a feature in The New York Times titled "Urban Renewal Threatens Historic Buildings in Salem, Mass." The article was credited a decade later with spotlighting the loss of history in downtown Salem and the turning around and redeveloping of Salem's downtown core.
 1968
 John Ward House added to the National Register of Historic Places.
 Peirce-Nichols House made a National Historic Landmark.
 1969
 Fort Pickering Light, also known as Winter Island Light, built in 1871, discontinued by the Coast Guard.
 Pickman House restored by Historic Salem and listed in the National Register of Historic Places.
 1970
 Hamilton Hall added to the National Register of Historic Places.
 Coast Guard Air Station Salem moved to Cape Cod.
 Gardner-Pingree House added to the National Historic Register
 30-acre  Winter Island park opened to the public.

 Forced to recognize the cost of urban renewal in downtown Salem, the Salem Redevelopment Authority retools its focus and starts focusing on preservation of the city's history downtown. By this time, 87 buildings had been destroyed, mostly 18th and 19th century homes.
 1972
 Old Town Hall Historic District added to the National Register of Historic Places.
 Essex Institute Historic District added to the National Register of Historic Places.
 1973
 Salem City Hall added to the National Register of Historic Places.
 Joseph Story House, a National Historic Landmark, added to the National Register of Historic Places.
 Fort Pickering   added to the National Register of Historic Places.
 1974
 The Gedney and Cox Houses, historic houses at 21 High Street, added to the National Historic Register.
 1975
 Thomas March Woodbridge House added to the National Historic Register.
 Charter Street Historic District  added to the National Register of Historic Places.
 1976
 Essex County Court Buildings added to the National Register of Historic Places.
 Bakers Island Light added to the National Register of Historic Places
 Derby Waterfront District  added to the National Register of Historic Places.
 Salem Common  added to the National Register of historic Places.
 1977
 Dodge Wing completed at the Peabody Essex Museum  
 1978
'Joshua Ward House added separately to the National Register of Historic Places.
 1979
 Salem City Hall was expanded in order to house city archives.
 1981
 Chestnut Street District created. Containing 407 buildings, this is the city's largest district. 

 1982
Rufus Choate House was added to the National Register of Historic Places

 1983
Fort Pickering Light was relit as a private aid to navigation by the City of Salem in 1983.
John P. Peabody House is a historic house at 15 Summer Street was added to the National Register of Historic Places.
Stephen Phillips House was added to the National Register of Historic Places in 1983 & is now owned and operated as a historic house museum by Historic New England and is open for public tours.
West Cogswell House, a historic set of row houses located at 5-9 Summer Street and was added to the National Register of Historic Places.
Wesley Methodist Church was added to the National Register of Historic Places.
Downtown Salem District was added to the National Register of Historic Places.
Crombie Street District was added to the National Register of Historic Places.
Shepard Block, located at 298-304 Essex Street and added to the National Register of Historic Places.
 First Universalist Church is added to the National Register of Historic Places.
 Salem Laundry was added to the National Register of Historic Places.
 YMCA is Salem is added to the National Register of Historic Places
Bessie Monroe House was added to the National Register of Historic Places
Bowker Place was added to the National Register of Historic Places
Federal Street District features Early Republic and Late Victorian architecture and was added to the National Register of Historic Places.
Parker Brothers in Salem, Massachusetts spent US$15 million establishing a book publishing branch; their first titles featured the American Greetings franchises, Care Bears and Strawberry Shortcake.  The branch published twelve titles by February 1984; sales of these books totalled 3.5 million units.  Parker Brothers also operated a record label around the same time; one of its releases, based on Coleco's Cabbage Patch Kids and involving Tom and Stephen Chapin, was certified Gold by the Recording Industry Association of America (RIAA) in July 1984.
1984
The entire area of Winter Island was added to the National Register of Historic Places as Winter Island Historic District and Archeological District
 1986
 The Salem Post Office is added to the National Register of Historic Places.
 1987
Derby Wharf Light Station is added to the National Register of Historic Places.

 1988
 Salem held its first annual  Salem Maritime Festival  the Salem Maritime National Historic Site
 1990
William Murray House was added to the National Register of Historic Places. 
 1991
 Sister city relationship established with Ōta, Tokyo, Japan.
 1992
 Peabody Essex Museum was formed by  mergeding with the Essex Institute to form the Peabody Essex Museum. Included in the merger was the legacy of the East India Marine Society, established in 1799 by a group of Salem-based ship captains.
 Phillips Library established.
 1994
Winter Island Light is a constituent part of the Winter Island Historic District and Archeological District, which was added to the National Register of Historic Places on April 14, 1994, reference number 94000335.
 Fort Lee was added to the National Register of Historic Places.
 Salem Willows Historic District was added to the National Register of Historic Places.
 St. Nicholas Orthodox Church and Rectory is added to the National Register of Historic Places.
 1997
Construction of the rigging shed (80-by-16-foot wooden building) at the Salem Maritime National Historic Site, a carpentry workshop and storage space since for The Friendship.
 1999
 The Salem Diner was added to the National Register of Historic Places.

21st century

 2000
 Friendship of Salem is a 171-foot replica of a 1797 East Indiaman, built in the Scarano Brothers Shipyard in Albany, New York, in 2000. The ship usually functions as a stationary museum during most of the year, however the ship is a fully functioning United States Coast Guard certified vessel capable of passenger and crew voyages, and will set sail during various times of the year. The first American National Historic Site is run by the   National Park Service at the Salem Maritime National Historic Site where the Friendship of Salem is docked.

 2001
 Pickering Wharf Marina opens as a full-service marina in Salem Harbor.
 Salem Water Taxi is founded in Salem Harbor.
 2002
 Bridge Street Neck Historic District was added to the National Register of Historic Places.
 2003
The National Park Service acquired the Pedrick Store House from the  town of Marblehead, this 1770 warehouse was built in Marblehead, just across the harbor from Salem, in 1770 by Thomas Pedrick, a successful member of the merchant community in pre-Revolutionary War Marblehead.
 The original Fame was a fast Chebacco fishing schooner that was reborn as a privateer when war broke out in the summer of 1812. She was arguably the first American privateer to bring home a prize, and she made 20 more captures before being wrecked in the Bay of Fundy in 1814. The new Fame is a full-scale replica of this famous schooner. Framed and planked of white oak and trunnel-fastened in the traditional manner, the replica of Fame was launched in 2003. She is now based at the Salem Maritime National Historic Site at Pickering Wharf Marina, where she takes the paying public for cruises on historic Salem Sound. 
Pioneer Village underwent a major renovation from  2003 until Spring 2008 when Gordon College (Massachusetts) took over its management along with Old Town Hall An Immersive Salem Witch Trials Experience.
 

The Peabody Essex Museum completed a massive $100 million renovation and expansion resulting in the opening a new wing designed by Moshe Safdie, more than doubling the gallery space to 250,000 square feet (23,000 m2); this allowed the display of many items from its extensive holdings, which had previously been unknown to the public due to lack of capability to show them. At this time, the museum also opened to the public the Yin Yu Tang House, an early 19th-century Chinese house from Anhui Province that had been removed from its original village and reconstructed in Salem.
 Yin Yu Tang House Yin Yu Tang, was built around 1800 in China. Over 200 years after construction the Yin Yu Tang House was disassembled in China, shipped to America and then reassembled in 2003 inside the Peabody Essex Museum.
 2005
 A homeless shelter opens in downtown Salem. as a result of the Catholic Archdiocese of Boston sex abuse scandal, a church is sold off and turned into a homeless shelter. The Archdiocese of Boston closed the parish in 2003, according to Historic Salem Inc.  "In 2005, the Salem Mission bought the closed St. Mary's Italian Church on Margin Street from the Archdiocese of Boston,"
 2006

 Kimberley Driscoll becomes mayor.
Waterfront redevelopment – The first step in the redevelopment was in 2006, when the State of Massachusetts gave Salem $1,000,000. The bulk of the money – $750,000 – was earmarked for acquisition of the Blaney Street landing, the private,  site off Derby Street used by the ferry. Another $200,000 was approved for the design of the new Salem wharf, a large pier planned for the landing, which officials said could be used by small cruise ships, commercial vessels and fishing boats.
 2007
 Salem Arts Association incorporated.
 Doyle Sailmakers expanded into a new 31,000 square foot loft in Salem, Massachusetts
 The City of Salem launched the Haunted Passport program which offers visitors discounts and benefits from local tourist attractions and retailers from October to April.
 On March 29, 2007, the House of the Seven Gables Historic District was designated a National Historic Landmark.
Pedrick Store House, a three-story building, constructed around 1770, is a historic rigging and sail loft, which the Park Service relocated from Marblehead to Salem in 2007 & construction began in the rebuilding of the Pedrick Store House, which had been in storage for many years disassembled – current location is Derby Wharf at the Salem Maritime National Historic Site.
 2008
Joseph Fenno House-Woman's Friend Society was listed on the National Register of Historic Places on September 17, 2008.
 2009
 Start of the Salem Farmers Market, taking place every Thursday – starting in June and going thru to October at Derby Square on Front Street Salem Farmers' Market
 2010
 The City of Salem's plans call for a total build-out of the current Blaney Street pier, known as the Salem Wharf project. When finished, the Blaney Street pier will be home to small to medium-sized cruise ships, commercial vessels and the Salem Ferry. This project is fully engineered and permitted.
On July 28, 2010, Governor of Massachusetts Deval Patrick signed into law today a bill that transforms Salem State College into Salem State University. Salem and eight other Massachusetts state colleges have collectively formed a new Massachusetts state university system.
Salem Harborwalk opened in July 2010 to celebrate the rebirth of the Salem waterfront as a source of recreation for visitors as well as the local community. The  walkway extends from the area of the Salem Fire Station to the Salem Waterfront Hotel.
 The $57.5 million, 525-student residence hall on Central Campus at Salem State University opened.

 2011
Opening of the $109 million J. Michael Ruane Judicial Centerin Salem, located at 56 Federal Street.
A bike program called Salem Spins, that offers bicycles, free of charge, with a fleet of 20 bicycles, split between two hubs, at Salem State University and downtown, near the Hawthorne Hotel.
 Waterfront redevelopment – construction crews were building a long seawall at the Blaney Street landing, which runs from the edge of the ferry dock back toward Derby Street and along an inner harbor. This is one of the early and key pieces of the Salem Pier, which the city hopes to have completed by 2014 and is the key to eventually bring cruise ships to Salem.
 A master plan was developed for  Winter Island in Salem, with help from the planning and design firm The Cecil Group of Boston and Bioengineering Group of Salem, and the City of Salem paid $45,000 in federal money. In the long term the projected cost to rehabilitate just the barracks is $1.5 million. But in the short term, there are multiple lower-cost items like a proposed $15,000 for a kayak dock or $50,000 to relocate and improve the bathhouse. This is a very important project since Fort Pickering guarded Salem Harbor as far back as the 17th century.
In 2011, a mahogany side chair with carving done by Samuel McIntire sold at auction for $662,500. The price set a world record for Federal furniture. McIntyre was one of the first architects in the United States, and his work represents a prime example of early Federal-style architecture. Elias Hasket Derby, Salem's wealthiest merchant and thought to be America's first millionaire, and his wife, Elizabeth Crowninshield, purchased the set of eight chairs from McIntire.  Samuel McIntyre's house and workshop were located at 31 Summer Street in what is now the Samuel McIntire Historic District.
 2012
 Waterfront redevelopment – In June 2012, the $1.75 million was awarded by the state of Massachusetts and will launch a first phase of dredging and construction of a  extension of the pier; a harborwalk to improve pedestrian access; and other lighting, landscaping and paving improvements.
The District, superior courthouses have was emptied and remained so since 2019 when the building was demolished.

 2013
 President Barack Obama on 10 January 2013 signed executive order HR1339 "which designates the City of Salem, Massachusetts, as the birthplace of the U.S. National Guard.
Salem has eight stations where drivers can charge their electric cars. Four are located at the Museum Place Mall near the Peabody Essex Museum and the other four are in the South Harbor garage across the street from the Salem Waterfront Hotel. The program started in January 2013 and will be free of charge for two years, allowing people to charge their electric cars and other electric vehicles for up to six hours. This program was paid for by a grant from the state of Massachusetts due to Salem's status as a Massachusetts Green Community.
 Salem State University campus – $74 million, 122,000-square-foot library at.  The new library will have more than 150 public computers and 1,000 seats of study space, from tables and desks to lounge chairs scattered throughout the building.
 Salem State University campus – $15 million 40,000-square-foot, two-story, glass-walled facility at the existing athletic O’Keefe Center complex. The new fitness facility will provide—in addition to more exercise equipment, two basketball courts, a yoga studio, and a conference/lecture hall that can accommodate an audience of 1000—a place where students can gather, connect and find a bit of respite from the rigors of their academic studies.
 Salem State University campus – Construction announcement of a $36 to $42 million Dorn for 350 to 400 students. A construction start in the spring of 2014 is the goal and to have the new residence hall open in 2015.
 Salem will be getting a new state-of-the-art, 20,000-square-foot Senior Center. In March 2013, The  Salem Senior Center was finalized in March 2013 by the Mayor of Salem & the Salem city councilors it is official with a $4.9 million bond — the final OK needed to build a community/senior center as part of a private/public development at Boston and Bridge streets. The Salem Senior Center will include parking for 374 automobiles.
 2014
The Coal-Fired Power Plant is Decommissioned, paving the way for a total transformation of the harbor in Salem.
In October 2014, the much anticipated Salem MBTA Parking Garage opened."This project has been 20 years in the making," said Mayor Kim Driscoll. "I was an intern in the planning department, this would’ve been 1988 ... people were talking about it then. Seriously, that long ago. That’s a long time ago."  The 714-space garage, built on a former MBTA parking lot, is just one part of the $44 million project to remake the station that began in July 2013.  The 714-space garage, built on a former MBTA parking lot, is just one part of the $44 million project to remake the station that began in July 2013 "This project has been 20 years in the making," said Mayor Kim Driscoll. "I was an intern in the planning department, this would’ve been late 1988.

 2015
 Footprint Power has cleared the last major hurdle on its way to building a $1 billion natural gas-fired plant on Salem Harbor.
 In June, officials hold groundbreaking for Salem's $1B Footprint power plant.
 Tourists from all over the world make up the over one million people visit Salem annually, and bring in over $100 million annually in tourism spending.
  Joshua Ward House, a historic Federal style brick house, built in 1784 and interior woodwoork was done by noted Salem builder and woodworker Samuel McIntire is turned into an 11-room boutique  Hotel. The building is owned by Salem residents Kimberly and Todd Waller.

 2016
Peabody Essex Museum's $49 million expansion proposal got critical support from the Design Review Board Wednesday night as the project draws closer to breaking ground.
Salem Harbor has four stops for 2016 new Salem Water Shuttle: Blaney Street, Congress Street, Salem Willows and Winter Island.
2017
The Registry of Deeds is proposed to be moved to the old Superior Court and County Commissioner buildings downtown. But the proposal has opposition.
 A Boutique 44 room hotel to open on the pedestrian mall in downtown with a roofdeck restaurant and street level cafe & bowling alley and a ground-floor coffee shop in the hotel's lobby with seasonal outdoor seating off the Essex Street entrance.
 Salem State University will open its $18 million Sophia Gordon Center for the Creative and Performing Arts on April 2.
 John Legend  was honored by Salem State University with an Advocate For Social Justice Award. Based on his extensive efforts to make a difference in the lives of others, Legend will be the inaugural recipient of the Salem Advocate for Social Justice award, presented by Salem Award Foundation for Human Rights and Social Justice.
 The City of Salem launched a new and improved bike sharing program with Zagster.
2018
 The City of Salem received a federal grant for $3,400,000 for a second ferry to operate out of Salem Harbor.  The grant was provided by the United States Department of Transportation
 A $50 million development project on the corner of Washington and Dodge Streets to build a 110-Room Hampton Inn  City officials estimate a $200,000 boost in new hotel occupancy tax revenues from the project with City Planning Director Tom Daniel said Maine Course Hospitality Group is seeking foundation and building permits for the project, which is being built on property bordering Dodge and Washington streets.
2019

The comedy film Hubie Halloween was filmed in Salem for Netflix starring Adam Sandler, & directed by Steven Brill.(Hubie Halloween also filmed in multiple towns on Massachusetts' North Shore, shooting scenes in Danvers, Marblehead, and Beverly.)
The original screenplay was written by Adam Sandler and Tim Herlihy.  The film has an all star cast with Shaquille O'Neal, Adam Sandler, Ray Liotta, Kevin James, Julie Bowen, Rob Schneider, June Squibb, Kenan Thompson, Vivian Nixon, Steve Buscemi, Maya Rudolph, Michael Chiklis, Tim Meadows, Karan Brar, Paris Berelc, China Anne McClain, Colin Quinn, Kym Whitley, Lavell Crawford, Mikey Day, Blake Clark, Tyler Crumley & George Wallace as the Mayor.

Opening of the Peabody Essex Museum's $200 million ‘Gallery Expansion Project.’ the PEM opened the 40,000-sq-ft Wing and 13 New Galleries and Exhibitions in September 2019, allocated from the museum's ambitious $650 million Advancement Campaign, launched in 2011.

Urban Spaces/Diamond Sinacori Break Ground on Salem Condo Complex is a $20 million project titles 'BRIX' will have 61 Residences and a mix of Retail to Former Courthouse location at 65 Washington Street, a few minute walk to the Salem Commuter Rail Station with train and bus service to Boston.

2020
 Hilton Hotels & Resorts under the brand Hampton Inn Salem with apartments opens in downtown.
 The City of Salem launched a microtransit network called the Salem Skipper in December 2020. an on-demand transit network is operated by Via allowing riders to share the same vehicle for approximately the same price as a MBTA Bus ticket. Passengers can hail a ride on their mobile device with the Salem Skipper app, or by calling a dispatcher.
2021
An on-demand transit network is operated by Via and allows riders to share the same vehicle for approximately the same price as a MBTA Bus ticket. Passengers can hail a ride on their mobile device with the Salem Skipper app, or by calling a dispatcher. a brand new ridesharing service serving the entire historic city.
 Salem's historic courthouse and commissioner's building, as well as plans to add 110 units of housing in an 8-story building next to the Salem MBTA Commuter Rail station. 
  Winn won a bid awarded by the Salem Redevelopment Authority to revitalize and incorporate Salem's historic courthouse buildings in the redevelopment project.
Recent documents submitted to the Community Preservation Committee show the entire project — the court buildings, crescent lot, and everything between — will cost more than $63 million to build. 
 A New Luxury Condo Building named BRIX opens with a lottery for the 6 affordable homeownership units being built at Brix Condominiums.
2022
 The Governor of Massachusetts, Charlie Baker, made a statement that $30 million  will go to Salem State University to redesign the campus and modernize areas.
 The City of Salem now required to provide ballots in Spanish with 20% of the population Spanish speaking, a first for the Witch City.
"The director of the Census has determined that the city of Salem is subject to the bilingual election requirements of Section 203 of the Voting Rights Act ... with respect to persons of Hispanic heritage," wrote Bert Russ, a deputy chief at the DOJ, in a recent letter to the city.

 Pickleball is now at the Salem Willows with new tennis courts and covered parking.  This project was funded paid by the Witch City's $30 million "Signature Parks" program that was launched in 2020 to boost Salem's most prominent Open space reserve ahead of its 400th anniversary in 2026.
 The House of Seven Gables on Turner Street received a state grant on a coastal resilience plan thanks to the Governor of Massachusetts Charlie Baker.  This $509,919 grant "Preserving History: Assessments and Climate Adaptations at the House of Seven Gables".
In October 2022 42 acres on the Salem waterfront is sold for $30 million.  This is latest milestone toward the development of the state's second major offshore wind port terminal. The Salem Harbor Wind Terminal is a public-private partnership between Crowley and the City of Salem, with AVANGRID serving as the port's anchor tenant for Offshore wind power construction.  Commonwealth Wind and Park City Wind projects are the main companies.
In November Kim Driscoll the Mayor of Salem  won a desk on Beacon Hill  as Massachusetts Brand New Lieutenant Governor of Massachusetts. Gov.-elect Maura Healey and Lt. Gov.-elect Kim Driscoll plan to hold their inaugural celebration at TD Garden on the night of Thursday, January 5, 2023."The January 5th inauguration will mark the first time an all-women ticket is sworn in to lead a state in American history, and make Healey the first lesbian Governor in the country," Healey's inaugural team announced. "Through their inaugural events, Healey and Driscoll plan to honor the people and movements that helped pave the way to make this historic moment possible."

Healey and Lt. Governor-elect Driscoll have attached the theme "Moving the Ball Forward" to their inaugural, a reference to their time as college and professional basketball players.

2023
 The three-time City Council president & now acting Salem Mayor Robert McCarthy will serve in the role vacated by Kim Driscoll. resignation to become lieutenant governor of Massacusetts.

See also
 Salem history
 List of mayors of Salem, Massachusetts
 Timeline of the Salem witch trials
 Timelines of other municipalities in Essex County, Massachusetts: Gloucester, Haverhill, Lawrence, Lynn, Newburyport

References

Bibliography

Published in the 19th century

Published in the 20th century
 
 
 
 
  + Chronology
  (fulltext via HathiTrust)

Published in the 21st century
 Dane Anthony Morrison and Nancy Lusignan Schultz, eds., Salem: Place, Myth, Memory (Boston: Northeastern University Press, 2004)

External links

 
 Works related to Salem, Massachusetts, various dates (via Digital Public Library of America).

 
 
salem